Scovil Neales (19 April 1864 – 13 March 1936)  was Dean of Fredericton from 1915 to 1932.

He was educated at the University of New Brunswick and   ordained in 1888. He was  Missionary-in-Charge at Southampton, New Brunswick until 1894 when he became Rector of  Andover, New Brunswick from 1894 to 1897; then Sussex, New Brunswick from 1897 until 1915. He was Archdeacon of Fredericton from 1895 to 1915.

Notes

1864 births
People from Queens County, New Brunswick
University of New Brunswick alumni
Deans of Fredericton
1936 deaths
Archdeacons of Fredericton